"Joker" is a song performed by Swiss singer Anna Rossinelli from her debut studio album Bon Voyage. The single was released on 14 October 2011 as a digital download in Switzerland. The song was written by Phillipa Alexander, Ellie Wyatt, Alex Ball, Vicky Nolan and produced by Fred Herrmann. It's a cover of "The Joker" by Kato, a Belgian artist, it was her first single after her participation at Idols 2011. The single was released in June 2011

Track listing

Credits and personnel
Lead vocals – Anna Rossinelli
Producer – Fred Herrmann
Lyrics – Phillipa Alexander, Ellie Wyatt, Alex Ball, Vicky Nolan
Label: Universal Music

Release history

References

External links
 Official website
 Anna Rossinelli on Facebook
 Anna Rossinelli on Twitter

2011 singles
Anna Rossinelli songs
2011 songs
Universal Music Group singles